District #3 is one of six districts located in Grand Bassa County, Liberia. The city of Buchanan, capital of Grand Bassa County, is located in the district.

References 

Districts of Liberia
Grand Bassa County